Brudenell River Provincial Park is a provincial park in Prince Edward Island, Canada. It lies on the north side of the Brudenell River. Brudenell River is the largest provincial park in eastern Prince Edward Island. Some of its land is used by Rodd Brudenell Resort. It has two public 18-hole golf courses, Brudenell River Golf Course and Dundarave Golf Course.

References 

Provincial parks of Prince Edward Island
Parks in Kings County, Prince Edward Island